is a pop song by the Japanese duo and idol unit ClariS, written by Shō Watanabe. It was released as the unit's eighth single on October 30, 2013 by SME Records. The song was used as the opening theme to the film Puella Magi Madoka Magica: Rebellion. A music video was produced for "Colorful", directed by Jungo.  The single peaked at No. 3 on Japan's weekly Oricon singles chart.

Composition
"Colorful" is a J-pop song with instrumentation from piano, violin, electric guitar, bass guitar, and drums. It is set in common time and moves at a tempo of 178 beats per minute. Beginning in the G-flat major key, the introduction starts with a music box and adds piano, drums and violin to transition into the first verse, followed by the chorus in A-flat major. After a short bridge, the key shifts back to G-flat major for the second verse and is again followed by the chorus in A-flat major, which use the same music with different lyrics. This is immediately followed by the third verse, interposed with a short break in F major followed by G-flat major, before finishing the third verse still in G-flat major. This is immediately followed by the chorus in A-flat major as the outro. A coda is used to close the song.

Release and reception
"Colorful" was released in a regular edition and two limited editions on October 30, 2013 as a CD by SME Records in Japan. One of the limited edition versions was packaged with Puella Magi Madoka Magica artwork and instead of containing an instrumental version of "Colorful" as in the other two editions, it has a short version of the song. The other limited edition version came bundled with a DVD containing the music video for "Colorful". The song peaked at No. 3 on Japan's weekly Oricon singles chart, and charted for 19 weeks. "Colorful" debuted and peaked on the Billboard Japan Hot 100 at No. 2.

Track listing

Personnel
ClariS
Clara – vocals
Alice – vocals

Production
Takashi Koiwa – mixer
Kōtarō Kojima – mastering
Tatsuo Murai – art direction, design

Charts

References

2013 singles
2013 songs
ClariS songs
SME Records singles
Puella Magi Madoka Magica songs
Japanese film songs
Songs written for animated films